Established in 2006 The Wahluke Slope AVA Wahluke,  was named after a Native American word for "watering place," is an American Viticultural area located within Grant County, Washington and is home to more than 20 vineyards and at least three wine production facilities. It is part of the larger Columbia Valley AVA. The 80,490 acre region features approximately 8,931 acres of vineyards: nearly 15 percent of the total wine grape acreage in the state. Top grape varieties: Merlot, Syrah, Cabernet Sauvignon, Riesling, Chardonnay, and Chenin Blanc, but this area is  primarily known for Merlot and Cabernet Sauvignon.

Geography and climate 
The Wahluke Slope AVA is located in the Wahluke Slope of Grant County, Washington. It extends from the Columbia River in the west, the Hanford Site boundary in the southwest, the north bank of the Columbia River on the south up to the Wahluke Slope Wildlife Refuge in the east, and along the  elevation of the Saddle Mountains on the north. Wahluke Slope has one of the driest, warmest climates in the state, allowing nearly complete control of vine vigor and ripening through irrigation.

The entire 81,000-acre appellation sits on a large alluvial fan, making the soils notably uniform over a large area. The topsoil is deep, wind-blown sand with a depth, on average, of more than 5 feet (150 cm). This provides both ample drainage for vinifera vines and greater uniformity in plant vigor and ripening than seen in other areas of Washington. The major distinguishing feature of the Wahluke Slope is its uniformity in aspect, soil type, and climate. The entire appellation lies on a broad, south-facing slope with a constant, gentle grade of less than 8%. This, along with the proximity to the Columbia River, helps minimize the risk of frost, which can affect other areas of the state.

This record was later tied at Ice Harbor Dam in 1961. The temperature was eventually surpassed on June 29, 2021, when Hanford reached .

The area is largely within the Mattawa, Washington 99349 area code.

See also 
Washington wine

References

American Viticultural Areas
Geography of Grant County, Washington
Washington (state) wine
2006 establishments in Washington (state)